Adrian David Swan (15 January 1930 – 29 September 1989) was an Australian figure skater. He represented Australia at the 1952 Winter Olympics, where he placed 10th. He was the first men's singles skater to represent Australia at the Olympics. In 1951, he also competed at the British Figure Skating Championships. Swan also competed in pair skating; he is the 1949 Australian national champion with partner Gwenneth Molony.

Competitive highlights

Pairs (with Molony)

References

External links
 
 

Australian male single skaters
Australian male pair skaters
Olympic figure skaters of Australia
Figure skaters at the 1952 Winter Olympics
1930 births
1989 deaths